Captain Amsale Gualu (born November 30, 1977) is an Ethiopian pilot. In 2010 she became the first female captain in the history of Ethiopia. She is also the first female captain on the Boeing 767, Boeing 777 and Boeing 787 in Ethiopia. Additionally Captain Amsale Gualu became the second African female pilot to command a Boeing 787.

Biography 
Amsale was born in 1977 in Bahir Dar, capital city of the Amhara Region. After moving to the capital city Addis Ababa she attended her primary school at Assai School and secondary school at Bole Highschool. She earned a BA from Addis Ababa University in Architecture.

On 2010 Amsale become the first Ethiopian female captain by flying an Ethiopian Airlines BombardierDHC-8-402Q400 from Addis Ababa to Gondar. Amsale graduated in 2002 from Ethiopian Airlines as the number six female pilot and worked for eight years before earning her captain title in 2010. In December 2017, Amsale captained the first Ethiopian Airlines international flight crewed entirely by women.

References 

Living people
1977 births
People from Amhara Region
Ethiopian aviators
Addis Ababa University alumni